Caterina Nozzoli (born 29 June 1967) is an Italian former professional tennis player.

Nozzoli played on the WTA Tour in the late 1980s and early 1990s, reaching a career high singles ranking of 130 in the world. Her best performance came early in her career, a semi-final appearance at the 1985 Italian Open. At the 1987 French Open she featured in the main draw of both the women's singles and doubles.

A member of Italy's Federation Cup squad in 1987, Nozzoli played a dead rubber doubles match in their World Group round one win over Belgium (with Laura Garrone).

She married tennis player Antonio Padovani.

ITF finals

Singles: 2 (1–1)

Doubles: 4 (2–2)

See also
List of Italy Fed Cup team representatives

References

External links
 
 
 

1967 births
Living people
Italian female tennis players
20th-century Italian women